Vega is a station on the Stockholm commuter train network, located in the neighbourhood of Vega within Haninge municipality on the Nynäs line.

The station opened in April 2019, and was built in conjunction with the development of the surrounding area. It is located between the stations Skogås and Handen, and has a central island platform. The ticket hall is located at the southern end of the station and preparations have been made for an entrance also at the northern end.

The station has a normal weekday about 1700 boarding passengers, and it is anticipated that once Vega district is fully developed, there will be approximately 4200 boarding passengers each day.  About 90 parking spaces for have been created, and bicycle parking is available, opposite the station entrance.

Travel time between Vega station and Stockholm City is approximately 25 minutes.  At the station there is an artistic decoration Flos Solis Maior by artist Ulla Fredriksson.

Connecting Transport 
Vega station is also served by a number of SL's bus lines.

History

Previous Station 
Between 1929 and 1973, there was a small stop called Vega on the then single-track Nynäs line, however this was in the different location to the current station.

Current Station 
Construction of the new station was started on 5 May 2015, with traffic starting on 1 April 2019.

Gallery

Exterior

Interior

Platform

References 

Haninge Municipality
Railway stations in Stockholm County
Railway stations opened in 2019